Gaudenis Vidugiris is a professional Magic: The Gathering player. His career highlights include three Grand Prix wins, and a second-place finish at Pro Tour Avacyn Restored in 2012. Though a resident of New York, Vidugiris has played for the Lithuanian national team a number of times.

Achievements 

Other accomplishments
 Lithuanian national champion 2012, 2013, 2014

Disqualification
Vidugiris was disqualified from Pro Tour Dublin in Round 1 for Unsporting Conduct — Cheating. Vidugiris was found to be covering up an incorrectly drawn number of cards to begin a game.

References

Magic: The Gathering players
Living people
Sportspeople from New York City
American people of Lithuanian descent
Year of birth missing (living people)